The Debbie Drake Show was an American exercise television show hosted by Debbie Drake that ran from 1960 to 1978.

Background

Debbie Drake started her show on WHIO-TV in Dayton, Ohio, then transferred to WISH-TV in Indianapolis' before the show gained a following and was syndicated nationwide.

Reception

The show was popular with men and women alike.

References

External links

1960 American television series debuts
1978 American television series endings
Black-and-white American television shows
English-language television shows
Exercise television shows
1960s American television series
1970s American television series
First-run syndicated television programs in the United States